Myripristis greenfieldi is a species of soldierfish belonging to the genus Myripristis. It is believed to be endemic to Japan, the Ogasawara islands and the Ryukyu Islands in the North-western Pacific Ocean. It is named after ichthyologist David Wayne Greenfield. It is demersal.

References

greenfieldi
Fish of the Pacific Ocean
Taxa named by John Ernest Randall